Argyrotaenia sphaleropa is a species of moth of the family Tortricidae. It is found in South America, where it has been recorded from Colombia, Bolivia, Brazil, Peru, Uruguay and Argentina.

The wingspan is about 15 mm for females and about 12 mm for males.

The larvae feed on Baccharis salicifolia, Citrus species, Cosmos species, Diospyros kaki, Medicago sativa, Mimosa diplotricha, Mentha sauveolens, Persea species, Hibiscus rosa-sinensis, Rapanea umbellata, Rosa species, Solanum bonariense, Lantana camara, Vitis species (including Vitis vinifera) and Mikania cordifolia. The larvae are considered a pest, causing damage to leaves and reproductive structures of numerous fruits, herbaceous and ornamental plant species.

References

Moths described in 1909
sphaleropa
Moths of South America